The 2015 Dahsyatnya Awards was an awards show for Indonesian musicians. It was the seventh annual show. The show was held on January 23, 2015, at the Istora Senayan in Tanah Abang, Central Jakarta. The awards show was hosted by Raffi Ahmad, Ayu Dewi, Denny Cagur, Nagita Slavina, Marcel Chandrawinata, Syahnaz Sadiqah, and Lolita Agustine. The awards ceremonies will held theme for "Dahsyatnya Tanpa Batas".

Andien led the nominations with six categories, followed by Noah with five nominations. Fatin Shidqia, Repvblik, and Tulus were the biggest winners of the night, taking home two awards apiece. Shidqia received awards for Outstanding Female Solo Singer and Outstanding Duet/Collaboration (with The Overtunes). Repvblik received awards for Outstanding Band and Outstanding Song for "Selimut Tetangga". Tulus received awards for Outstanding Video Clip and Outstanding Video Clip Director, both for "Baru".

Performers

Resident DJ
 DJ Una
 DJ Dipha Barus
 DJ Yasmin

Presenters
 Raffi Ahmad, Ayu Dewi, and Denny Cagur – Presented Outstanding Male Solo Singer and Outstanding Female Solo Singer
 Raffi Ahmad, Marcel Chandrawinata, and Lolita Agustine – Presented Outstanding Newcomer
 Raffi Ahmad, Supermerry, Syahnaz Sadiqah, and Denny Cagur – Presented Outstanding Duo/Group
 Raffi Ahmad, Nagita Slavina, Denny Cagur, and Supermerry – Presented Outstanding Moment
 Raffi Ahmad and Nagita Slavina – Presented Outstanding Dangdut Singer and Outstanding Band
 Ayu Ting Ting and Syahrini – Presented Outstanding Couple
 Syahnaz Sadiqah and Marcel Chandrawinata – Presented Outstanding Video Clip
 Raffi Ahmad, Nagita Slavina, Denny Cagur, Ayu Dewi, Syahnaz Sadiqah, Lolita Agustine, Tina Toon, and Supermerry – Presented Outstanding Song

Winners and nominees
Winners are listed first and highlighted on boldface.

SMS and social media

Jury

References

2015 music awards
Dahsyatnya Awards
Indonesian music awards